Deepface may refer to one of the following:

Deepface (band), from Australia
DeepFace, a facial recognition system created by Facebook in 2014